Hidromek is a heavy equipment manufacturer founded in Ankara in 1978.

History 
Hidromek was founded in 1978 by Hasan Basri Bozkurt in a small workshop in Ankara. In the first years, Hidromek produced parts such as pumps and torque converters for construction machines. In the following years, Hidromek was engaged in the business of producing and assembling loader and digger attachments on the agricultural tractors and converting them into a construction machine. In 1989, Hidromek produced its first original machine, the first backhoe loader. In 1999, Hidromek made its first international sale to Tunisia. In 2000, Hidromek produced the first excavator. Production and assembly facilities are located in Ankara and Izmir, overseas production and assembly facilities are located in Spain, Russia and Thailand. In 2013, Hidromek acquired the Motor Grader unit of Japanese machinery manufacturer Mitsubishi Heavy Industries.

Hdromek started to develop military heavy equipment for armies. In 2014 the Spanish Army bought HMK102B backhoe loaders.

Gallery

External links 

 Official website

References 

Turkish brands
Construction equipment manufacturers of Turkey
Manufacturing companies based in Ankara
Defence companies of Turkey
Turkish companies established in 1978